The Gudgeonville Covered Bridge was an  long Multiple King-post Truss covered bridge over Elk Creek in Girard Township, Erie County in the U.S. state of Pennsylvania. It was built in 1868 and was listed on the National Register of Historic Places on September 17, 1980. It was destroyed by arson on November 8, 2008.

It was the oldest of the three remaining covered bridges in Erie County. The bridge structure's sufficiency rating on the Federal Highway Administration National Bridge Inventory was only 14.6 percent and its condition was deemed "basically intolerable requiring high priority of corrective action".

History

Construction 
The Gudgeonville Bridge was constructed around 1868 and was rebuilt in the early 1870s after a fire. The bridge is located in Girard Township and crosses Elk Creek.  The bridge was built and designed by William Sherman. The foundation of the bridge is believed to be remnants of the Erie Extension Canal. The name of the bridge has been a mystery with some sources indicating that the bridge was constructed to provide access to a gudgeon factory.

Modern use and status 
The bridge has been damaged from numerous small fires and has been the site of constant vandalism over the years. There were several proposals to dismantle the bridge and move it to a more secure location where it would not be vandalized. Another proposal was to build another bridge to bypass the original bridge, as it is too narrow to allow a variety of vehicles to cross it, including snowplows, fire trucks, and ambulances.

Evans' 2001 Pennsylvania's covered bridges: a complete guide described the bridge to be "structurally sound," but its general appearance to be "most disappointing". The Federal Highway Administration National Bridge Inventory found the sufficiency rating of the bridge structure to be only 14.6 percent. It found that the bridge's foundations were determined to "scour critical," meaning that the bridge's foundations were "determined to be unstable for the calculated scour conditions," and that the railing "does not meet currently acceptable standards". Its overall condition was deemed "basically intolerable requiring high priority of corrective action", with an estimated cost to improve the bridge of $107,000.

Destruction 
The Gudgeonville Covered Bridge caught fire around 1:40 am local time on November 8, 2008. The blaze was determined by the Pennsylvania State Police to have been an arson. On December 17, the State Police arrested two suspects after they confessed to dousing the bridge in gasoline and setting it on fire. The suspects were also involved in several other incidents in northern Crawford County and western Erie County. In August 2009, one of the arsonists was convicted and sentenced to 5 to 10 years in prison for the destruction of the bridge and for an unrelated charge.

The remains of the bridge were lifted from its abutments and set in a nearby field and dismantled to allow for a temporary bridge to be built in its place on January 26. The Pennsylvania Department of Transportation (PennDOT) would not allow an exact replica of the covered bridge as it still would not be up to code. The temporary, prefabricated bridge was erected in August 2009, funded by an insurance policy held by the township. The new bridge was needed quickly as a permanent, concrete bridge would have taken three years to design and build. Without a bridge, traffic would have had to make a  detour.

Bridge dimensions 

The following table is a comparison of published measurements of length, width and load recorded in different sources using different methods, as well as the name or names cited. NBI measures bridge length between the "backwalls of abutments" or pavement grooves and the roadway width as "the most restrictive minimum distance between curbs or rails". The NRHP form was prepared by the Pennsylvania Historical and Museum Commission (PHMC), which surveyed county engineers, historical and covered bridge societies, and others for all the covered bridges in the commonwealth. The Evans visited every covered bridge in Pennsylvania in 2001 and measured each bridge's length (portal to portal) and width (at the portal) for their book. The data in Zacher's book was based on a 1991 survey of all covered bridges in Pennsylvania by the PHMC and PennDOT, aided by local government and private agencies. The article uses primarily the NBI and NRHP data, as they are national programs.

* Listed mainspan length only

See also 

 List of bridges on the National Register of Historic Places in Pennsylvania

Notes 

a. The National Highway Administration established the  sufficiency rating, which can vary from a low of 0 to a high of 100, as a way to prioritize federal funding for bridges. The rating is calculated based on "structural adequacy, whether the bridge is functionally obsolete, and level of service provided to the public". Federal funds are available for replacement of bridges with a rating of 50 or below, while those with a rating of 80 or below qualify for rehabilitation.

References 

2008 disestablishments in Pennsylvania
Covered bridges in Erie County, Pennsylvania
Demolished buildings and structures in Pennsylvania
Demolished bridges in the United States
Bridges completed in 1868
Covered bridges on the National Register of Historic Places in Pennsylvania
Wooden bridges in Pennsylvania
Bridges in Erie County, Pennsylvania
Covered bridges in the United States destroyed by arson
Arson in Pennsylvania
National Register of Historic Places in Erie County, Pennsylvania
Road bridges on the National Register of Historic Places in Pennsylvania
1868 establishments in Pennsylvania